Spin is a conserved quantity carried by elementary particles, and thus by composite particles (hadrons) and atomic nuclei.

Spin is one of two types of angular momentum in quantum mechanics, the other being orbital angular momentum. The orbital angular momentum operator is the quantum-mechanical counterpart to the classical angular momentum of orbital revolution and appears when there is periodic structure to its wavefunction as the angle varies. For photons, spin is the quantum-mechanical counterpart of the polarization of light; for electrons, the spin has no classical counterpart.

The existence of electron spin angular momentum is inferred from experiments, such as the Stern–Gerlach experiment, in which silver atoms were observed to possess two possible discrete angular momenta despite having no orbital angular momentum. The existence of the electron spin can also be inferred theoretically from the spin–statistics theorem and from the Pauli exclusion principle—and vice versa, given the particular spin of the electron, one may derive the Pauli exclusion principle.

Spin is described mathematically as a vector for some particles such as photons, and as spinors and bispinors for other particles such as electrons. Spinors and bispinors behave similarly to vectors: they have definite magnitudes and change under rotations; however, they use an unconventional "direction". All elementary particles of a given kind have the same magnitude of spin angular momentum, though its direction may change. These are indicated by assigning the particle a spin quantum number.

The SI unit of spin is the same as classical angular momentum (i.e., N·m·s, J·s, or kg·m2·s−1). In practice, spin is given as a dimensionless spin quantum number by dividing the spin angular momentum by the reduced Planck constant , which has the same dimensions as angular momentum, although this is not the full computation of this value. Very often, the "spin quantum number" is simply called "spin". The fact that it is a quantum number is implicit.

Quantum number

As the name suggests, spin was originally conceived as the rotation of a particle around some axis. While the question of whether elementary particles actually rotate is ambiguous (as they appear point-like), this picture is correct insofar as spin obeys the same mathematical laws as quantized angular momenta do; in particular, spin implies that the particle's phase changes with angle. On the other hand, spin has some peculiar properties that distinguish it from orbital angular momenta:
 Spin quantum numbers may take half-integer values.
 Although the direction of its spin can be changed, an elementary particle cannot be made to spin faster or slower.
 The spin of a charged particle is associated with a magnetic dipole moment with a -factor differing from 1. This could occur classically only if the internal charge of the particle were distributed differently from its mass.

The spin angular momentum  of any physical system is quantized.

Fermions and bosons
The two families of particles obey different rules and broadly have different roles in the world around us. A key distinction between the two families is that fermions obey the Pauli exclusion principle: that is, there cannot be two identical fermions simultaneously having the same quantum numbers (meaning, roughly, having the same position, velocity and spin direction). Fermions obey the rules of Fermi–Dirac statistics. In contrast, bosons obey the rules of Bose–Einstein statistics and have no such restriction, so they may "bunch together" in identical states. Also, composite particles can have spins different from their component particles. For example, a helium-4 atom in the ground state has spin 0 and behaves like a boson, even though the quarks and electrons which make it up are all fermions.

This has some profound consequences:
 Quarks and leptons (including electrons and neutrinos), which make up what is classically known as matter, are all fermions with spin . The common idea that "matter takes up space" actually comes from the Pauli exclusion principle acting on these particles to prevent the fermions from being in the same quantum state. Further compaction would require electrons to occupy the same energy states, and therefore a kind of pressure (sometimes known as degeneracy pressure of electrons) acts to resist the fermions being overly close. Elementary fermions with other spins (etc.) are not known to exist.
 Elementary particles which are thought of as carrying forces are all bosons with spin 1. They include the photon, which carries the electromagnetic force, the gluon (strong force), and the W and Z bosons (weak force). The ability of bosons to occupy the same quantum state is used in the laser, which aligns many photons having the same quantum number (the same direction and frequency), superfluid liquid helium resulting from helium-4 atoms being bosons, and superconductivity, where pairs of electrons (which individually are fermions) act as single composite bosons. Elementary bosons with other spins (0, 2, 3, etc.) were not historically known to exist, although they have received considerable theoretical treatment and are well established within their respective mainstream theories. In particular, theoreticians have proposed the graviton (predicted to exist by some quantum gravity theories) with spin 2, and the Higgs boson (explaining electroweak symmetry breaking) with spin 0. Since 2013, the Higgs boson with spin 0 has been considered proven to exist. It is the first scalar elementary particle (spin 0) known to exist in nature.
 Atomic nuclei have nuclear spin which may be either half-integer or integer, so that the nuclei may be either fermions or bosons.

Spin–statistics theorem

The spin–statistics theorem splits particles into two groups: bosons and fermions, where bosons obey Bose–Einstein statistics, and fermions obey Fermi–Dirac statistics (and therefore the Pauli exclusion principle). Specifically, the theory states that particles with an integer spin are bosons, while all other particles have half-integer spins and are fermions. As an example, electrons have half-integer spin and are fermions that obey the Pauli exclusion principle, while photons have integer spin and do not. The theorem relies on both quantum mechanics and the theory of special relativity, and this connection between spin and statistics has been called "one of the most important applications of the special relativity theory".

Relation to classical rotation
Since elementary particles are point-like, self-rotation is not well-defined for them.

Photon spin is the quantum-mechanical description of light polarization, where spin +1 and spin −1 represent two opposite directions of circular polarization. Thus, light of a defined circular polarization consists of photons with the same spin, either all +1 or all −1. Spin represents polarization for other vector bosons as well.

For fermions, the picture is less clear. Angular velocity is equal by Ehrenfest theorem to the derivative of the Hamiltonian to its conjugate momentum, which is the total angular momentum operator . Therefore, if the Hamiltonian H is dependent upon the spin S, dH/dS is non-zero, and the spin causes angular velocity, and hence actual rotation, i.e. a change in the phase-angle relation over time. However, whether this holds for free electron is ambiguous, since for an electron, S2 is constant, and therefore it is a matter of interpretation whether the Hamiltonian includes such a term. Nevertheless, spin appears in the Dirac equation, and thus the relativistic Hamiltonian of the electron, treated as a Dirac field, can be interpreted as including a dependence in the spin S. Under this interpretation, free electrons also self-rotate, with the Zitterbewegung effect understood as this rotation.

Magnetic moments

Particles with spin can possess a magnetic dipole moment, just like a rotating electrically charged body in classical electrodynamics. These magnetic moments can be experimentally observed in several ways, e.g. by the deflection of particles by inhomogeneous magnetic fields in a Stern–Gerlach experiment, or by measuring the magnetic fields generated by the particles themselves.

The intrinsic magnetic moment  of a spin- particle with charge , mass , and spin angular momentum , is

 

where the dimensionless quantity  is called the spin -factor. For exclusively orbital rotations it would be 1 (assuming that the mass and the charge occupy spheres of equal radius).

The electron, being a charged elementary particle, possesses a nonzero magnetic moment. One of the triumphs of the theory of quantum electrodynamics is its accurate prediction of the electron -factor, which has been experimentally determined to have the value , with the digits in parentheses denoting measurement uncertainty in the last two digits at one standard deviation. The value of 2 arises from the Dirac equation, a fundamental equation connecting the electron's spin with its electromagnetic properties, and the correction of ... arises from the electron's interaction with the surrounding electromagnetic field, including its own field.

Composite particles also possess magnetic moments associated with their spin. In particular, the neutron possesses a non-zero magnetic moment despite being electrically neutral. This fact was an early indication that the neutron is not an elementary particle. In fact, it is made up of quarks, which are electrically charged particles. The magnetic moment of the neutron comes from the spins of the individual quarks and their orbital motions.

Neutrinos are both elementary and electrically neutral. The minimally extended Standard Model that takes into account non-zero neutrino masses predicts neutrino magnetic moments of:

 

New physics above the electroweak scale could, however, lead to significantly higher neutrino magnetic moments. It can be shown in a model-independent way that neutrino magnetic moments larger than about 10−14  are "unnatural" because they would also lead to large radiative contributions to the neutrino mass. Since the neutrino masses are known to be at most about 1 eV, the large radiative corrections would then have to be "fine-tuned" to cancel each other, to a large degree, and leave the neutrino mass small. The measurement of neutrino magnetic moments is an active area of research. Experimental results have put the neutrino magnetic moment at less than  times the electron's magnetic moment.

On the other hand elementary particles with spin but without electric charge, such as a photon or a Z boson, do not have a magnetic moment.

Curie temperature and loss of alignment
In ordinary materials, the magnetic dipole moments of individual atoms produce magnetic fields that cancel one another, because each dipole points in a random direction, with the overall average being very near zero. Ferromagnetic materials below their Curie temperature, however, exhibit magnetic domains in which the atomic dipole moments spontaneously align locally, producing a macroscopic, non-zero magnetic field from the domain. These are the ordinary "magnets" with which we are all familiar.

In paramagnetic materials, the magnetic dipole moments of individual atoms will partially align with an externally applied magnetic field. In diamagnetic materials, on the other hand, the magnetic dipole moments of individual atoms align oppositely to any externally applied magnetic field, even if it requires energy to do so.

The study of the behavior of such "spin models" is a thriving area of research in condensed matter physics. For instance, the Ising model describes spins (dipoles) that have only two possible states, up and down, whereas in the Heisenberg model the spin vector is allowed to point in any direction. These models have many interesting properties, which have led to interesting results in the theory of phase transitions.

Direction

Spin projection quantum number and multiplicity
In classical mechanics, the angular momentum of a particle possesses not only a magnitude (how fast the body is rotating), but also a direction (either up or down on the axis of rotation of the particle). Quantum-mechanical spin also contains information about direction, but in a more subtle form. Quantum mechanics states that the component of angular momentum for a spin-s particle measured along any direction can only take on the values

 

Conventionally the direction chosen is the  axis:

 

where  is the spin component along the  axis,  is the spin projection quantum number along the  axis.

The number "" is the multiplicity of the spin system. These correspond to quantum states in which the spin component is pointing in the +z or −z directions respectively, and are often referred to as "spin up" and "spin down". For a spin- particle, like a delta baryon, the possible values are +, +, −, −.

Vector

For a given quantum state, one could think of a spin vector  whose components are the expectation values of the spin components along each axis, i.e., . This vector then would describe the "direction" in which the spin is pointing, corresponding to the classical concept of the axis of rotation. It turns out that the spin vector is not very useful in actual quantum-mechanical calculations, because it cannot be measured directly: ,  and  cannot possess simultaneous definite values, because of a quantum uncertainty relation between them. However, for statistically large collections of particles that have been placed in the same pure quantum state, such as through the use of a Stern–Gerlach apparatus, the spin vector does have a well-defined experimental meaning: It specifies the direction in ordinary space in which a subsequent detector must be oriented in order to achieve the maximum possible probability (100%) of detecting every particle in the collection. For spin- particles, this probability drops off smoothly as the angle between the spin vector and the detector increases, until at an angle of 180°—that is, for detectors oriented in the opposite direction to the spin vector—the expectation of detecting particles from the collection reaches a minimum of 0%.

As a qualitative concept, the spin vector is often handy because it is easy to picture classically. For instance, quantum-mechanical spin can exhibit phenomena analogous to classical gyroscopic effects. For example, one can exert a kind of "torque" on an electron by putting it in a magnetic field (the field acts upon the electron's intrinsic magnetic dipole moment—see the following section). The result is that the spin vector undergoes precession, just like a classical gyroscope.  This phenomenon is known as electron spin resonance (ESR). The equivalent behaviour of protons in atomic nuclei is used in nuclear magnetic resonance (NMR) spectroscopy and imaging.

Mathematically, quantum-mechanical spin states are described by vector-like objects known as spinors. There are subtle differences between the behavior of spinors and vectors under coordinate rotations. For example, rotating a spin- particle by 360° does not bring it back to the same quantum state, but to the state with the opposite quantum phase; this is detectable, in principle, with interference experiments. To return the particle to its exact original state, one needs a 720° rotation. (The Plate trick and Möbius strip give non-quantum  analogies.) A spin-zero particle can only have a single quantum state, even after torque is applied. Rotating a spin-2 particle 180° can bring it back to the same quantum state, and a spin-4 particle should be rotated 90° to bring it back to the same quantum state. The spin-2 particle can be analogous to a straight stick that looks the same even after it is rotated 180°, and a spin-0 particle can be imagined as sphere, which looks the same after whatever angle it is turned through.

Mathematical formulation

Operator

Spin obeys commutation relations analogous to those of the orbital angular momentum:

 

where  is the Levi-Civita symbol.

 

The spin raising and lowering operators acting on these eigenvectors give

 

where .

But unlike orbital angular momentum, the eigenvectors are not spherical harmonics.

All quantum-mechanical particles possess an intrinsic spin  (though this value may be equal to zero). The projection of the spin  on any axis is quantized in units of the reduced Planck constant, such that the state function of the particle is, say, not , but , where  can take only the values of the following discrete set:

 

One distinguishes bosons (integer spin) and fermions (half-integer spin). The total angular momentum conserved in interaction processes is then the sum of the orbital angular momentum and the spin.

Pauli matrices 

The quantum-mechanical operators associated with spin- observables are

 

where in Cartesian components

 

Pauli exclusion principle

For systems of  identical particles this is related to the Pauli exclusion principle, which states that its wavefunction  must change upon interchanges of any two of the  particles as

 

Thus, for bosons the prefactor  will reduce to +1, for fermions to −1. In quantum mechanics all particles are either bosons or fermions. In some speculative relativistic quantum field theories "supersymmetric" particles also exist, where linear combinations of bosonic and fermionic components appear. In two dimensions, the prefactor  can be replaced by any complex number of magnitude 1 such as in the anyon.
 
The above permutation postulate for -particle state functions has most important consequences in daily life, e.g. the periodic table of the chemical elements.

Rotations

As described above, quantum mechanics states that components of angular momentum measured along any direction can only take a number of discrete values. The most convenient quantum-mechanical description of particle's spin is therefore with a set of complex numbers corresponding to amplitudes of finding a given value of projection of its intrinsic angular momentum on a given axis.

 

For a generic particle with spin , we would need  such parameters. Since these numbers depend on the choice of the axis, they transform into each other non-trivially when this axis is rotated. It is clear that the transformation law must be linear, so we can represent it by associating a matrix with each rotation, and the product of two transformation matrices corresponding to rotations A and B must be equal (up to phase) to the matrix representing rotation AB. Further, rotations preserve the quantum-mechanical inner product, and so should our transformation matrices:

 
 

Mathematically speaking, these matrices furnish a unitary projective representation of the rotation group SO(3). Each such representation corresponds to a representation of the covering group of SO(3), which is SU(2). There is one -dimensional irreducible representation of SU(2) for each dimension, though this representation is -dimensional real for odd  and -dimensional complex for even  (hence of real dimension ). For a rotation by angle  in the plane with normal vector ,

 

A generic rotation in 3-dimensional space can be built by compounding operators of this type using Euler angles:

 

An irreducible representation of this group of operators is furnished by the Wigner D-matrix:

where

 

is Wigner's small d-matrix.

 

This fact is a crucial element of the proof of the spin–statistics theorem.

Lorentz transformations

We could try the same approach to determine the behavior of spin under general Lorentz transformations, but we would immediately discover a major obstacle. Unlike SO(3), the group of Lorentz transformations SO(3,1) is non-compact and therefore does not have any faithful, unitary, finite-dimensional representations.

In case of spin- particles, it is possible to find a construction that includes both a finite-dimensional representation and a scalar product that is preserved by this representation. We associate a 4-component Dirac spinor  with each particle. These spinors transform under Lorentz transformations according to the law

 

It can be shown that the scalar product

 

is preserved. It is not, however, positive-definite, so the representation is not unitary.

Each of the (Hermitian) Pauli matrices of spin- particles has two eigenvalues, +1 and −1. The corresponding normalized eigenvectors are

 

(Because any eigenvector multiplied by a constant is still an eigenvector, there is ambiguity about the overall sign. In this article, the convention is chosen to make the first element imaginary and negative if there is a sign ambiguity. The present convention is used by software such as SymPy; while many physics textbooks, such as Sakurai and Griffiths, prefer to make it real and positive.)

The quantum state of a particle (with respect to spin), can be represented by a two-component spinor:

 

Following the measurement, the spin state of the particle collapses into the corresponding eigenstate. As a result, if the particle's spin along a given axis has been measured to have a given eigenvalue, all measurements will yield the same eigenvalue (since , etc.), provided that no measurements of the spin are made along other axes.

Measurement of spin along an arbitrary axis

The operator to measure spin along an arbitrary axis direction is easily obtained from the Pauli spin matrices. Let  be an arbitrary unit vector. Then the operator for spin in this direction is simply

 

This method of finding the operator for spin in an arbitrary direction generalizes to higher spin states, one takes the dot product of the direction with a vector of the three operators for the three -, -, -axis directions.

A normalized spinor for spin- in the  direction (which works for all spin states except spin down, where it will give ) is

 

The above spinor is obtained in the usual way by diagonalizing the  matrix and finding the eigenstates corresponding to the eigenvalues. In quantum mechanics, vectors are termed "normalized" when multiplied by a normalizing factor, which results in the vector having a length of unity.

Compatibility of spin measurements 

Since the Pauli matrices do not commute, measurements of spin along the different axes are incompatible. This means that if, for example, we know the spin along the  axis, and we then measure the spin along the  axis, we have invalidated our previous knowledge of the  axis spin. This can be seen from the property of the eigenvectors (i.e. eigenstates) of the Pauli matrices that

 

So when physicists measure the spin of a particle along the  axis as, for example, the particle's spin state collapses into the eigenstate . Let us say, in our example, that we measure . This implies that the original measurement of the spin along the  axis is no longer valid, since the spin along the  axis will now be measured to have either eigenvalue with equal probability.

Higher spins

The spin- operator  forms the fundamental representation of SU(2). By taking Kronecker products of this representation with itself repeatedly, one may construct all higher irreducible representations. That is, the resulting spin operators for higher-spin systems in three spatial dimensions can be calculated for arbitrarily large  using this spin operator and ladder operators. For example, taking the Kronecker product of two spin- yields a four-dimensional representation, which is separable into a 3-dimensional spin-1 (triplet states) and a 1-dimensional spin-0 representation (singlet state).

The resulting irreducible representations yield the following spin matrices and eigenvalues in the z-basis:

Also useful in the quantum mechanics of multiparticle systems, the general Pauli group  is defined to consist of all -fold tensor products of Pauli matrices.

The analog formula of Euler's formula in terms of the Pauli matrices
 

for higher spins is tractable, but less simple.

Parity 
In tables of the spin quantum number  for nuclei or particles, the spin is often followed by a "+" or "−". This refers to the parity with "+" for even parity (wave function unchanged by spatial inversion) and "−" for odd parity (wave function negated by spatial inversion). For example, see the isotopes of bismuth, in which the list of isotopes includes the column nuclear spin and parity. For Bi-209, the only stable isotope, the entry 9/2– means that the nuclear spin is 9/2 and the parity is odd.

Applications 
Spin has important theoretical implications and practical applications. Well-established direct applications of spin include:
 Nuclear magnetic resonance (NMR) spectroscopy in chemistry;
 Electron spin resonance (ESR or EPR) spectroscopy in chemistry and physics;
 Magnetic resonance imaging (MRI) in medicine, a type of applied NMR, which relies on proton spin density;
 Giant magnetoresistive (GMR) drive-head technology in modern hard disks.

Electron spin plays an important role in magnetism, with applications for instance in computer memories. The manipulation of nuclear spin by radio-frequency waves (nuclear magnetic resonance) is important in chemical spectroscopy and medical imaging.

Spin–orbit coupling leads to the fine structure of atomic spectra, which is used in atomic clocks and in the modern definition of the second. Precise measurements of the -factor of the electron have played an important role in the development and verification of quantum electrodynamics. Photon spin is associated with the polarization of light (photon polarization).

An emerging application of spin is as a binary information carrier in spin transistors. The original concept, proposed in 1990, is known as Datta–Das spin transistor. Electronics based on spin transistors are referred to as spintronics. The manipulation of spin in dilute magnetic semiconductor materials, such as metal-doped ZnO or TiO2 imparts a further degree of freedom and has the potential to facilitate the fabrication of more efficient electronics.

There are many indirect applications and manifestations of spin and the associated Pauli exclusion principle, starting with the periodic table of chemistry.

History

Spin was first discovered in the context of the emission spectrum of alkali metals. In 1924, Wolfgang Pauli introduced what he called a "two-valuedness not describable classically" associated with the electron in the outermost shell. This allowed him to formulate the Pauli exclusion principle, stating that no two electrons can have the same quantum state in the same quantum system.

The physical interpretation of Pauli's "degree of freedom" was initially unknown. Ralph Kronig, one of Landé's assistants, suggested in early 1925 that it was produced by the self-rotation of the electron. When Pauli heard about the idea, he criticized it severely, noting that the electron's hypothetical surface would have to be moving faster than the speed of light in order for it to rotate quickly enough to produce the necessary angular momentum. This would violate the theory of relativity. Largely due to Pauli's criticism, Kronig decided not to publish his idea.

In the autumn of 1925, the same thought came to Dutch physicists George Uhlenbeck and Samuel Goudsmit at Leiden University. Under the advice of Paul Ehrenfest, they published their results. It met a favorable response, especially after Llewellyn Thomas managed to resolve a factor-of-two discrepancy between experimental results and Uhlenbeck and Goudsmit's calculations (and Kronig's unpublished results). This discrepancy was due to the orientation of the electron's tangent frame, in addition to its position.

Mathematically speaking, a fiber bundle description is needed. The tangent bundle effect is additive and relativistic; that is, it vanishes if  goes to infinity. It is one half of the value obtained without regard for the tangent-space orientation, but with opposite sign. Thus the combined effect differs from the latter by a factor two (Thomas precession, known to Ludwik Silberstein in 1914).

Despite his initial objections, Pauli formalized the theory of spin in 1927, using the modern theory of quantum mechanics invented by Schrödinger and Heisenberg. He pioneered the use of Pauli matrices as a representation of the spin operators and introduced a two-component spinor wave-function. Uhlenbeck and Goudsmit treated spin as arising from classical rotation, while Pauli emphasized, that spin is non-classical and intrinsic property.

Pauli's theory of spin was non-relativistic. However, in 1928, Paul Dirac published the Dirac equation, which described the relativistic electron. In the Dirac equation, a four-component spinor (known as a "Dirac spinor") was used for the electron wave-function. Relativistic spin explained gyromagnetic anomaly, which was (in retrospect) first observed by Samuel Jackson Barnett in 1914 (see Einstein–de Haas effect). In 1940, Pauli proved the spin–statistics theorem, which states that fermions have half-integer spin, and bosons have integer spin.

In retrospect, the first direct experimental evidence of the electron spin was the Stern–Gerlach experiment of 1922. However, the correct explanation of this experiment was only given in 1927.

See also 

 Chirality (physics)
 Dynamic nuclear polarization
 Helicity (particle physics)
 Holstein–Primakoff transformation
 Kramers' theorem
 Pauli equation
 Pauli–Lubanski pseudovector
 Rarita–Schwinger equation
 Representation theory of SU(2)
 Spin angular momentum of light
 Spin engineering
 Spin-flip
 Spin isomers of hydrogen
 Spin–orbit interaction
 Spin tensor
 Spin wave
 Yrast

References

Further reading

 
 
 
 
 
 
 
 

Sin-Itiro Tomonaga, The Story of Spin, 1997

External links

Goudsmit on the discovery of electron spin.
Nature: " Milestones in 'spin' since 1896."
ECE 495N Lecture 36: Spin Online lecture by S. Datta

Rotational symmetry
Quantum field theory
Physical quantities